Salaspils Parish is an administrative unit of the Salaspils Municipality, Latvia. It was created in 2010 from the countryside territory of Salaspils town. At the beginning of 2014, the population of the parish was 5329.

Towns, villages and settlements of Salaspils parish 
 Acone
 Bunči
 Saulkalne
 Stopiņi

See also 
 Dole Manor
 Doles sala
 Vecdole Castle

References

External links 
 

Parishes of Latvia
Salaspils Municipality